Crataegus suksdorfii, (Suksdorf's hawthorn), formerly Crataegus douglasii var. suksdorfii, is a species of hawthorn found in the Pacific Northwest. It is diploid versus tetraploid for Crataegus douglasii. The most significant morphological difference from C. douglasii is that it has 20 stamens rather than 10. The two species are found in different geographic ranges, have different flowering times, and different time lengths for fruit development.

References

External links 

 

suksdorfii